The RS Vision is a sailing dinghy created by RS Sailing designed for 2 crew members. It can, however, be sailed by a larger crew or be single handed. It is sailed at many clubs around the world.

Performance and design
The RS Vision is roomy and stable. An  owners club and events circuit is established. The RS Vision is a good boat for training, being stable and with plenty of room for two trainees and an instructor. The boat is fitted with the Gnav kicker system leaving the cockpit uncluttered and free.

References

External links
 RS Sailing (Global HQ)
 ISAF Connect to Sailing
 International RS Classes Association
 UK RS Association
 German RS Class Association

Dinghies
Boats designed by Phil Morrison
Sailboat types built by RS Sailing